Raipur and Naya Raipur BRTS is a bus rapid transit in Raipur and Naya Raipur, Chhattisgarh India.  It is operated by Naya Raipur Mass Transport Ltd (NRMTL). It was inaugurated by Prime Minister Narendra Modi on 2 November 2016.

Technology

Automatic transmission buses will be using radio frequency identification system. Public information systems will be installed at each stations and information based on GPS system will be provided to travelers.  "Intelligent Tracking System" used for Bus System.

Corridor List

Routes 
Following are the nine stations in the operational route. 
 HNLU Gate
 Uparwara 
 Sector-29 
 Sector-27 
 South Block 
 North Block 
 Ekatma Path 
 CBD 
 Mahanadi Bhavan 
 Indravati Bhavan
The bus travels further to Raipur Railway station.

See also 
 List of bus rapid transit systems

References 

Bus rapid transit in India
Transport in Raipur, Chhattisgarh
Naya Raipur
2016 establishments in Chhattisgarh